Euthycera chaerophylli is a species of fly in the family Sciomyzidae, the marsh flies or snail-killing flies.

Distribution
This species can be found in most of Europe and in the Near East.

Description

This fly has a slender body. The gray thorax shows 4 lines of brown spots. The prominent eyes are reddish. The head is yellowish. The yellowish antennae are forward-pointing. The wings are mottled with greyish spots.

Biology
These flies are univoltine and overwinter in the puparia. The larvae develop in slugs. They develop inside body of the host (endoparasitoids), mainly Deroceras  species.

References

Sciomyzidae
Insects described in 1798
Articles containing video clips
Muscomorph flies of Europe